Lone is an unincorporated community in Lee County, Kentucky. Lone has a post office with ZIP code 41347.

References

Unincorporated communities in Lee County, Kentucky
Unincorporated communities in Kentucky